Patrick Burrows (born November 5, 1959 in Barrie, Ontario) is a former field hockey defender from Canada. He played in the Summer Olympics in 1984 and 1988, and was an assistant coach for Canada's 2000 Olympic team. Burrows was also on Canada's gold-medal winning Pan American Games teams in 1983 and 1987. He works at Castilleja School.

References

External links
 
 
 
 

1959 births
Living people
Male field hockey defenders
Canadian field hockey coaches
Canadian male field hockey players
Olympic field hockey players of Canada
Field hockey people from Ontario
Field hockey players at the 1984 Summer Olympics
Field hockey players at the 1988 Summer Olympics
Pan American Games gold medalists for Canada
Field hockey players at the 1983 Pan American Games
Field hockey players at the 1987 Pan American Games
Sportspeople from Barrie
Pan American Games medalists in field hockey
1998 Men's Hockey World Cup players
Medalists at the 1983 Pan American Games
Medalists at the 1987 Pan American Games
20th-century Canadian people
21st-century Canadian people